Laurent Tobel (born 24 June 1975) is a French former competitive figure skater. He is the 1998 Nepela Memorial champion, 1995 Czech Skate bronze medalist, and 1999 French national champion. In the same season, Tobel achieved his career-best ISU Championship results – fifth at the 1999 Europeans in Prague and eighth at the 1999 Worlds in Helsinki.

Tobel's coaches included Gilles Beyer, Annick Gailhaguet, and Pierre Trente. After retiring from competition, he became involved in shows.

Programs

Results
GP: Champions Series / Grand Prix

References

External links
 Laurent Tobel Entertainment

French male single skaters
Living people
1975 births
People from Savigny-sur-Orge
Sportspeople from Essonne
20th-century French people